Lilian Masediba Matabane Ngoyi, "Mma Ngoyi", (25 September 1911 – 13 March 1980) was a South African anti-apartheid activist. She was the first woman elected to the executive committee of the African National Congress, and helped launch the Federation of South African Women.

Prior to becoming a machinist at a textile mill, where she was employed from 1945 to 1956, Ngoyi enrolled to become a nurse.

Early life 
Ngoyi was born in Bloed Street, Pretoria. She was the only daughter of Annie and Isaac Matabane, and a sister to three brothers, Lawrence, George and Percy. Her grandfather, on her mother's side, was Johannes Mphahlele, a member of the royal Mphahlele household, who became a Methodist evangelist, working alongside Samuel Mathabathe. Ngoyi's mother worked as a washerwoman and her father was a mineworker. Ngoyi attended Kilnerton Primary School until Standard Two.

In 1928, she moved to Johannesburg to train as a nurse at City Deep Mine Hospital, and completed three years of training in general nursing. During this time, she met and married a van driver, John Gerard Ngoyi, in 1934. They had a daughter, Edith Ngoyi. Lilian's husband died in a motor car accident in 1937, after which she became a seamstress, working both from home and in garment factories at various times. From the 1950s onwards, she lived in Orlando, Soweto, with her mother and her children.

Political activism 
Having been drawn into politics via her work in the Garment Workers' Union of South Africa in the 1940s, Ngoyi joined the ANC Women's League in 1952; she was at that stage a widow with children and an elderly mother to support, and worked as a seamstress. A year later she was elected as President of the Women's League. In 1954, she helped to found the Federation of South African Women (FEDSAW) and was elected to the national executive of the ANC; she was the first woman to be elected to national office in the organisation.

On 9 August 1956, Ngoyi led a women's march along with Helen Joseph, Rahima Moosa, Sophia De Bruyn, Motlalepula Chabaku, Bertha Gxowa and Albertina Sisulu of 20,000 women to the Union Buildings of Pretoria in protest against the apartheid government requiring women to carry passbooks as part of the pass laws.

Lilian Ngoyi was also a transnational figure who recognised the potential influence that international support could have on the struggle against apartheid and the emancipation of black women. With this in mind she had, in 1955, embarked on an illegal journey to Lausanne, Switzerland, in order to participate in the World Congress of Mothers held by the Women's International Democratic Federation (WIDF). Accompanied by her fellow activist Dora Tamana, and as an official delegate of FEDSAW, she embarked on a journey that would see an attempt to stow away on a boat leaving Cape Town under "white names", defy (with the help of a sympathetic pilot) segregated seating on a plane bound for London and gain entry to Britain under the pretext of completing her course in Bible studies. She would visit England, Germany, Switzerland, Romania, China and Russia, meeting women leaders often engaged in left-wing politics, before arriving back in South Africa a wanted woman.

Ngoyi was known as a strong orator and a fiery inspiration to many of her colleagues in the ANC. She was among the 156 Treason Trialists arrested in December 1956, and was finally acquitted of the charges against her in 1960. She was rearrested more than once in the early 1960s, and spent 71 days in solitary confinement in 1963. Ngoyi spent a total of 15 years living under three five-year banning orders, which included restrictions that confined her to her home in Orlando, Soweto, and prevented her from meeting any other banned persons. Additional conditions of the banning orders included being forbidden to attend public gatherings, make speeches or be quoted; even at her own home, she was not permitted to be with more than one person at the same time. The first two banning orders were imposed in 1962 and 1967, and when the second banning order expired in 1972, she was able to meet colleagues and friends again, and travelled to Durban and Cape Town. In 1975, a banning order against her was imposed again; however, this time its conditions did allow her some communication with the outside world.

Memorials and honours
The Koos Beukes Clinic at the Chris Hani Baragwanath Hospital in Soweto has been renamed Lilian Ngoyi Community Clinic in her honour.

On 16 November 2004, the South African Ministry of the Environment launched the lead ship in a class of environmental patrol vessels named  in her honour.

On 9 August 2006, the 50th anniversary of the march on Pretoria, Strijdom Square from which the women marched was renamed Lilian Ngoyi Square. 
9 August is commemorated in South Africa as Women's Day.

In 2009, a residence hall at Rhodes University was renamed in her honour.

In 2012, Van der Walt Street in Pretoria was renamed Lilian Ngoyi Street. Other roads in Cape Town, Thembisa, Berea, Durban, and Hartbeesfontein have been named in her honour.

The City of Johannesburg decided to honor Mme Lilian Masediba Ngoyi by renaming the Bree Street in Johannesburg after her in 2014 – the street named Lilian Ngoyi Street.

References

External links
 ANC historical documents
 Bernstein, Hilda, 1975. For Their Triumphs and for Their Tears – Women in Apartheid South Africa, International Defence & Aid Fund, London, United Kingdom.
 "Women's Anti-Pass Law Campaigns in South Africa", About.com
 Women's Day March – 9 August 1956

1911 births
1980 deaths
People from Pretoria
Members of the African National Congress
Anti-apartheid activists
South African prisoners and detainees
Prisoners and detainees of South Africa
Machinists
Textile workers